The Ohio River Valley AVA is an American Viticultural Area centered on the Ohio River and surrounding areas. The area is mostly planted with hybrid grapes like Baco noir, Marechal Foch, Seyval blanc and Vidal. Of the Vitis vinifera found in the area Cabernet Franc, Cabernet Sauvignon, Chardonnay, Petit Manseng  and Riesling are the most common. The AVA size was decreased by approximately 1,530 square miles when the Indiana Uplands AVA was established in 2013 composed of the bordering area in Indiana.

History
The Ohio River Valley AVA is the birthplace of American viticulture. Wine has been produced in Ohio since 1823 when Nicholas Longworth planted the first Alexander and Isabella grapes in the Ohio River Valley. In 1825, Longworth planted the first Catawba grapes in Ohio. Others soon planted Catawba in new vineyards throughout the state and by 1860, Catawba was the most important grape variety in Ohio. At this time, Ohio produced more wine than any other state in the country, and Cincinnati was the most important city in the national wine trade. Of the 570,000 gallons of wine that were produced each year in Ohio, 200,000 came from Brown County.

In the 1800s, wine was expensive, so non-trellised vines succumbed to fungal diseases. Horses could farm the narrow ridges, but tractors could not. Tobacco farming became profitable. And as in many other states, Prohibition in the United States destroyed the Ohio wine industry, which has struggled to recover.

Climate and geology
The Ohio River is a climatic transition area as its water runs along the periphery of the humid subtropical climate and humid continental climate thereby being inhabited by fauna and flora of both climates. The hardiness zones are 6b and 7a.

The Ohio River is young from a geologic standpoint. The river formed on a piecemeal basis beginning between 2.5 and 3 million years ago. The earliest Ice Ages occurred at this time and dammed portions of north flowing rivers. The Teays River was the largest of these rivers, and the modern Ohio River flows within segments of the ancient Teays. The ancient rivers were rearranged or consumed by glaciers and lakes.

The vineyard soils of the Ohio River Valley are diverse, being on the boundary between glaciated and non-glaciated.

References

External links
 Ohio River Valley Wineries on American Winery Guide 
 TTB AVA Map

American Viticultural Areas
Indiana wine
Kentucky wine
Ohio River
Ohio wine
West Virginia wine
1983 establishments in the United States